Check My Ears is a compilation of the three 7" vinyl singles Turn released throughout 2000. The primary singles were "Facedown", "Beretta" and "Beeswax'". The B Sides that complete the six-track EP are "Truth", "Plan" and "Never Needed".

Although Check My Ears was only released on CD, it kept in tone with the Vinyl releases, as the back insert had a circle cut out to link up the letters 'UR' which appeared on the CD itself to 'T' and 'N' which appear on the left and right sides of the cutout. The CD itself also had only a small circle label in the middle, while all 7" singles were released on clear vinyl with small circle labels as well. The Inlay cover also folded out to show the covers of the Facedown, Beretta and "Beeswax" singles.

Track listing 

 Beretta (2:58)
 Facedown (5:45)
 Truth (4:09)
 Beeswax (3:10)
 Plan (3:58)
 "Never Needed You" (2:52)

Check My Ears on Irish Music Central

Album line-up 

 Ollie Cole - Guitars, Vocals, Piano
 Ian Melady - Drums, vocals
 Gavin Fox - Bass
 Fiona Melady - Backing Vocals, Piano

References 

Turn (band) albums
2000 EPs